The Supermarine Scapa was a British general reconnaissance flying boat built by Supermarine that was used by the Royal Air Force between 1935 and 1939. It was developed from the Southampton and formed the basis of the later Stranraer flying boat.

Development
After experimenting with a three-engine design of flying boat, (the Nanok/Solent/Southampton X), Supermarine's chief designer, R.J. Mitchell, decided that the good hydrodynamic design that had been developed in the twin-engined Southampton, would be the platform for the next aircraft.

A prototype designated the Southampton IV was built. It had a hull that performed even better in the tank tests. An Air Ministry Specification was received in November 1931. The test pilot Joseph "Mutt" Summers took the first flight on 8 July 1932. The name had then been changed to the Scapa.

15 Scapas were built before production was changed to a more powerful development, the Stranraer.

Design
The Scapa hull was an all-metal structure, while the wing and tail surfaces had metal structure with fabric covering. The two Rolls-Royce Kestrel V-12 engines were mounted in nacelles underslung from the upper wing, and there were two fins, each placed at the mid semi-span of the tailplane. Similar to the Southampton, there were three gun positions; one in the nose and two staggered in the rear fuselage, each provided with a single .303 British (7.7 mm) caliber Lewis Mk.I machine guns.

Operators

  
 Royal Air Force
 No. 202 Squadron RAF
 No. 204 Squadron RAF
 No. 228 Squadron RAF
 No. 240 Squadron RAF

Specifications (Scapa)

See also

References

Further reading

1930s British military reconnaissance aircraft
Flying boats
Scapa
Biplanes
Aircraft first flown in 1932
Twin piston-engined tractor aircraft